Digitolabrum is an extinct genus of sea snails in the family Aporrhaidae. Most species are from the Eocene of France. D. abedi and D. elegans are from the Eocene of Egypt.

See also 
 List of marine gastropod genera in the fossil record

References 

 Une nouvelle espèce de Digitolabrum (Gastropoda:  Littorinimorpha: Rostellariidae) dans l’Éocène moyen du Bassin d’Aquitaine. Pacaud J.M., Ledon D. and Caze B., Cossmanniana, volume 13, pages 33–47, 2011
 Cuvillier (J.), 1930 - Révision du Nummulitique égyptien. Mémoires de l'Institut d'Egypte, t. 16, p. 1-372

External links 

 
 
 Digitolabrum elegans at the Museum National d'Histoire Naturelle, Paris

Aporrhaidae
Prehistoric gastropod genera